Biomphalaria camerunensis is a species of gastropods belonging to the family Planorbidae.

The species is found in freshwater environments.

References

Planorbidae
Gastropods described in 1941